Jules Mazellier (6 April 1879 – 6 February 1959) was a French composer and conductor.

Mazellier studied at the Conservatoire de Paris. In 1909 he won the Prix de Rome for his composition La Roussalka. He composed chamber music, works for piano, songs and various operas.

Selected works 
Opera
La Roussalka, Légende russe in 1 act (1909); libretto by Eugène Adénis and Fernand Beissier
Graziella, Poème romantique in 4 acts, 5 scenes (1910–1912); libretto by Henri Caïn and Raoul Gastambide; premiere 6 March 1913 in Rouen
La villa Médicis, Comédie lyrique in 3 acts (1923); libretto by the composer
Les Matines d'Amour (The Bells of Love), Fabliau-miracle en trois images (1927); libretto by Raoul Gastambide; premiere 16 December 1927 at the Théâtre National de L'Opéra

Orchestral
Contemplation, Rêverie (1908)
Circenses, Poème symphonique (1911)
Impressions d'été, Suite (1911)

Concertante
Scherzo, choral et variations sur un thème unique for piano and orchestra

Chamber music
Divertissement Pastoral for flute and piano (1931)
Prélude et Danse for bassoon and piano (1931)
Poème Romantique for violin and piano (or orchestra) (1933)
Rhapsodie Montagnarde for horn and piano (1933)
Nocturne et Rondeau for viola and piano (1934)
Fantaisie-Ballet for clarinet and piano (1936)
Ballade for violin and piano
Berceuse for violin and piano
Chanson for cello and piano
Contemplation for violin and piano
Fileuse for cello and piano
Légende dramatique for trumpet and piano
2 Pièces brèves for flute and piano
5 Pièces brèves for cello and piano

Piano
Bercelonette (1946)
Complainte pour Noël, Variations pastorales (1946)
Nocturne (1946)

Vocal
Le Livre Chantant, 10 Mélodies for voice and orchestra
Prière de Saint-François d'Assise for voice, violin, cello and organ

Pedigogical
500 Dictées musicales à une, deux, trois et quatre voix in four volumes

References

External links 
 Jules Mazellier at zinfonia.com
 

1879 births
1959 deaths
20th-century classical composers
French classical composers
French male classical composers
French male conductors (music)
20th-century French composers
20th-century French conductors (music)
20th-century French male musicians